Eresus walckenaerius is a species of ladybird spider from the eastern Mediterranean.

Description
While males are very similar to those of Eresus sandaliatus or Eresus cinnaberinus the females are up to 4 cm long. The females often have a red band on their opisthosoma. Adult males can be found from April to June.

Habits
Their strikingly pink webs are built below rocks. One egg sac contains several hundred eggs, and spiderlings seem to disperse much more than other Eresus species (using ballooning), so that they are not found in large clusters.

Distribution
This species is found on the southern Balkans, in southern Italy, in Turkey and on islands of the Aegean Sea.

Name
The species name is in honor of Charles Athanase Walckenaer.

Subspecies
Eresus walckenaeri moerens C. L. Koch, 1846 (Afghanistan)

References

Eresidae
Spiders of Asia
Spiders of Europe
Arthropods of Turkey
Spiders described in 1832